Wielgolas may refer to the following places:
Wielgolas, Lublin Voivodeship (east Poland)
Wielgolas, Mińsk County in Masovian Voivodeship (east-central Poland)
Wielgolas, Pułtusk County in Masovian Voivodeship (east-central Poland)